Kaadhal Mannan is a 1998 Indian Tamil-language romantic drama film directed by Saran, which stars Ajith Kumar and Maanu. The film also saw music composer M. S. Viswanathan make his debut in a supporting role, whilst Vivek, Karan and Girish Karnad also played other roles. The film was released on 6 March 1998 to positive reviews and commercial success.

Plot 
Rudran, a strict disciplinarian and father of two daughters, hates the word 'Love'. The very mention of this word makes him punish himself to extreme heights. He has disowned his elder daughter Menaka because she eloped with her lover. The strictness is doubled for the younger daughter Thilottama, and a marriage alliance is fixed for her. She stoically accepts her father's decision until she meets Shiva, a local mechanic. Shiva lives with his friend Oyya in a mansion owned by Mess Viswanthan. Shiva is always ready to accept dares. When Menaka dares him to go to Chennai to deliver a letter to Thilothama, Shiva ends up falling in love with Thilothama, but she is unable to reveal her love to Shiva and her father, as she fears the consequences. The film revolves around whether the lovers are able to declare their love for each other, and if Rudran accepts it.

Cast 

 Ajith Kumar as Shiva, mechanic
 Maanu as Thilothama
 M. S. Viswanathan as Mess Viswanthan, mansion owner
 Vivek as Oyya, Shiva's friend
 Nithya as Manjari (Thilothama's friend)
 Karan as Ranjan
 Girish Karnad as Rudran, Black Dog security service MD
 Dhaarini as Menaka, Thilothama's sister
 Ramesh Khanna as Black Dog security service Inspector
 Rathan as Ranjan's father
 Dhamu as Person in Mansion
 Ramji a special appearance in Maarimuthu song
 Kanal Kannan as Taxi Driver (special appearance)
 Shalu Shamu as Thilothama's niece (Child Artist (Uncredited)) 
 Chaams (Uncredited role)

Production 
Saran describes that he "was wondering what would happen if a girl, who is engaged to a particular person, falls in love with someone else" and this formed the basis of his plot for the film. The film saw veteran music composer M. S. Viswanathan make his acting debut in a supporting role, whilst the lead actress Maanu from Assam and music composer Bharadwaj also debuted. Viswanathan had initially waded away the approach but actor Vivek later convinced him to partake in the film. Few scenes were shot at Murugesan Mansion at Triplicane.

Soundtrack 

The soundtrack of the film was composed by Bharadwaj, except the song "Mettu Thedi" which was composed by M. S. Viswanathan. All lyrics were written by Vairamuthu.

Release 
The film released on 6 March 1998 in 108 screens worldwide. It won positive reviews from critics, with a reviewer praising the film for tackling a taboo subject. The critic claimed that Ajith Kumar "was back at his best", whilst also crediting success to Bharadwaj's soundtrack. Despite winning plaudits for her portrayal, Maanu quit the film industry for over a decade before resurfacing as a promoter for the 2010 Singaporean film Gurushetram – 24 Hours of Anger and later as an aide to Rajinikanth during his health-related visit to Singapore in 2011.

The film was commercial success at the box office as it released during a period of crisis in the film industry where the FEFSI strikes were ongoing and thus the distributors refused to pick the film up outright and insisted on distribution only. The first copy was worth Rs 22 million, but was only sold for Rs 16 million. Still, it ran for 100 days and re-established Ajith's market after a string of failures.

References

External links 

 

1998 romantic drama films
1998 films
Indian romantic drama films
1990s Tamil-language films
Films directed by Saran
1998 directorial debut films
Films scored by Bharadwaj (composer)